The Social Justice Party is a political party in Artsakh, founded in 2005.

History
The chairperson of the Social Justice Party is Karen Ohanjanyan, coordinator of the human rights organization, Helsinki Initiative '92, which is part of the Helsinki Citizens Assembly network. The Social Justice Party failed to receive any seats following the 2005 Nagorno-Karabakh parliamentary election and obtained just 0.04% of the popular vote.

The party did not participate in the 2015 Nagorno-Karabakh parliamentary election and currently has no representation in the National Assembly.

See also

 Elections in Artsakh
 List of political parties in Artsakh

References

Political parties in the Republic of Artsakh
Political parties established in 2005